Brent Huff (born March 11, 1961) is an American actor, writer and film director. Huff is best known for his recurring role of Smitty in the hit ABC show, The Rookie.  He has also had recurring roles in Shameless, Pensacola: Wings of Gold and Black Scorpion. Some of Huff's other television appearances include, Mad Men, The West Wing, NCIS, Jag, and Cold Case.

Huff has written and directed many award-winning feature films and documentaries including, The Jackie Stiles Story, It's a Rockabilly World, Cat City, Chasing Beauty, Welcome to Paradise, A Genie's Tail and 100 Mile Rule.

Huff grew up in Springfield, Missouri and attended Kickapoo High School.  Both Huff and Brad Pitt are members of the Kickapoo Theater Hall-of-Fame.

Huff was a Theater Major at the University of Missouri.

Selected filmography

Actor
Coach (1978)
The Perils of Gwendoline in the Land of the Yik-Yak (1984), with Tawny Kitaen
Nine Deaths of the Ninja (1985), with Sho Kosugi
Deadly Passion (1985), with Ingrid Boulting
Summer Fantasy (1985), with Julianne Phillips and Ted Shackelford
Armed Response (1986), with David Carradine and Lee Van Cleef
Stormquest (1987)
Cop Game (1988)
Strike Commando 2 (1988), with Richard Harris
Born to Fight (1989)
After the Condor (1990)
Falling from Grace (1992), with John Mellencamp, John Prine and Mariel Hemingway
Veterinarian Christine (1993), with Ernest Borgnine
 (1993), with Barry Newman and Ernest Borgnine
 (1993), with George Hamilton and Morgan Fairchild
I Spy Returns (1994), with Bill Cosby and Robert Culp
Diagnosis: Murder (TV series, episode: The Plague, 1994)
The Black Curse (1995), with James Brolin and Deborah Shelton
Tinkercrank (1995)
Oblivion: Backlash (1996)
Dark Skies (TV series, episode: Moving Targets, 1996)
Diagnosis: Murder (TV series, episode: Murder by Friendly Fire, 1996)
Scorpio One (1996)
The Bad Pack (1997), with Robert Davi, Roddy Piper and Ralf Möller
Dead Tides (1997), with Roddy Piper and Tawny Kitaen
Hollywood Confidential (1997), with Charlize Theron
Girls' Night (1998), with Brenda Blethyn, Julie Walters and Kris Kristofferson
Pensacola: Wings of Gold (TV series, 11 episodes, 1998–1999)
Hitman's Run (1999), with Eric Roberts
Hot Boyz (1999), with Snoop Dogg and Master P.
Hijack (1999), with Jeff Fahey and Ernie Hudson
Submerged (2000), with Coolio, Maxwell Caulfield, and Nicole Eggert
JAG (TV series, episode: Surface Warfare, 2000)
Beautiful (2000)
Black Scorpion (TV series, 4 episodes, 2001)
Cold Case (TV series, episode: Sherry Darlin''', 2003)Lucky (TV series, episode: Calling Dr. Con, 2003)Bad Bizness (2003)Final Examination (2003), with Kari WuhrerThe West Wing (TV series, episode: No Exit, 2004)Glass Trap (2005), with C. Thomas Howell and Stella StevensDead and Deader (2006)Breaking Point (2009)Mad Men (TV series, episode: Waldorf Stories, 2010)Kill Speed (2010)Attack of the 50 Foot Cheerleader (2012)D-TEC (2015)NCIS (TV series, episode: Oil and Water, 2015)Killing Lazarus (2016)Christmas Trade (2016)Shameless (TV series, 3 episodes, 2018–2019)The Rookie (TV series, 32 episodes, 2019–2022)Tyson's Run (2019)Deadly Draw (2022)A Genie's Tail (2022)The Rookie: Feds (TV series, 4 episodes, 2022)

DirectorWe the People (1994), with James BrolinThe Bad Pack (1997), with Robert Davi, Roddy Piper and Ralf Möller100 Mile Rule (2003), with Maria Bello, Jake Weber, and Michael McKeanWelcome to Paradise (2007)Treasure Raiders (2007), with David Carradine, Steven Brand, and Sherilyn FennCat City (2010), with Rebecca Pidgeon, Julian Sands, and Brian DennehySerbian Scars (2009), with Michael Madsen, Mark Dacascos, and Vladimer RajcicLast Will (2010), with Tatum O'Neal, Tom Berenger, and Peter CoyoteHero (2012, short)Helpless'' (2012, short)

References 

https://shoutoutla.com/meet-brent-huff-actor-director/

http://voyagela.com/interview/conversations-with-brent-huff/

http://www.virgilfilms.com/2016/10/07/filmmaker-fridays-brent-huff/

https://www.bulletproofaction.com/tag/brent-huff/ 

https://patch.com/new-york/smithtown/calendar/event/20220721/1902504/basketball-legend-jackie-stiles-director-brent-huff-up-next-on-tom-needham-s-sounds-of-film

External links 
 
 
 {{TV Guide | https://www.tvguide.com/celebrities/brent-huff/3000034305/}}

American male actors
American film directors
Male models from Missouri
American male writers
Living people
University of Missouri alumni
1961 births